Juan Pablo Segovia (born 21 March 1989) is an Argentine professional footballer who plays as a defender for Liga MX club Necaxa.

Honours
Lanús
Torneo Apertura: 2007-08

References

External links
 

Living people
1989 births
Argentine footballers
People from Corrientes
Club Atlético Atlanta footballers
Club Atlético Los Andes footballers
C.D. Cuenca footballers
C.S.D. Independiente del Valle footballers
América de Cali footballers
Argentine expatriate footballers
Expatriate footballers in Ecuador
Argentine expatriate sportspeople in Ecuador
Association football defenders
Sportspeople from Corrientes Province